Rabana may refer to:

Rabana Chhaya, a form of shadow puppetry from the eastern Indian state of Odisha
Rapelang Rabana, computer scientist and entrepreneur
Rabana-Merquly, a cluster of archaeological sites in Sulaymaniyah Governorate, Kurdistan Region, Iraq

See also
Raban (disambiguation)
Rabanal (disambiguation)